Lička is a Czech surname. Notable people with the surname include:

 Marcel Lička (born 1977), Czech footballer and coach
 Mario Lička (born 1982), Czech footballer
 Werner Lička (born 1954), Czech footballer and manager
 Ronald Lička (born 1974), American musical artist and producer

Czech-language surnames